Himanshu Dinesh Jain (born 6 September 1991) is an Indian professional snooker player.

Jain turned professional in 2022 after as one of two semi-finalists from the Q School Asia & Oceania event 2 a two-year tour card for the 2022–23 and 2023–24 snooker seasons. He became the fifth Indian to make an entry into the professional circuit and the first to do so via qualification rather than their Asian or World Championship ranking.

Performance and rankings timeline

References

External links
Himanshu Dinesh Jain at wst.tv

Indian snooker players
1991 births
Living people